Qılınclı or Qilincli or Gilinjli or Kilichli or Kylychly may refer to:

Qılınclı, Kalbajar, a village in the Kalbajar District of Azerbaijan
Qılınclı, Lachin, a village in the Lachin District of Azerbaijan

See also
 Qılıçlı (disambiguation)
 Kılıçlı (disambiguation)